The 2017–18 Aruban Division di Honor is the 57th season of the Aruban Division di Honor, the top tier of football in Aruba.

The regular season began on 13 October 2017 and concluded on 5 May 2018. The league champions and berths into the Caribbean Club Shield will be determined through a four-team postseason tournament, known as the Caya 4. The Caya 4 began on 18 May 2018 and concluded 3 July 2018.

Teams 
There were 10 clubs that competed during the season.

Regular season

Playoffs

Caya 4

Championship 
First Leg [Jun 27]

Nacional        0-0 Dakota

Second Leg [Jul 3]

Dakota          4-2 Nacional

Third Leg [Jul 7, if necessary]

Nacional        n/p Dakota

Top goalscorers

References 

Aruban Division di Honor seasons
Aruba
football
football